Gunne is a surname. Notable people with the surname include:

Carl Gunne (1893–1979), Swedish painter
John Gunne (English politician), English politician
John Gunne (1872–1935), Canadian physician and politician

See also
Gunn (surname)
Gunner (name)
Gunnes